Soyuz 1 (Union 1) was a crewed spaceflight of the Soviet space program. Launched into orbit on 23 April 1967 carrying cosmonaut colonel Vladimir Komarov, Soyuz 1 was the first crewed flight of the Soyuz spacecraft. The flight was plagued with technical issues, and Komarov was killed when the descent module crashed into the ground due to a parachute failure. This was the first in-flight fatality in the history of spaceflight.

The original mission plan was complex, involving a rendezvous with Soyuz 2 and an exchange of crew members before returning to Earth. However, the launch of Soyuz 2 was called off due to thunderstorms.

Crew

Backup crew

Mission parameters 
 Mass: 
 Perigee: 
 Apogee: 
 Inclination: 50.8°
 Period: 88.7 minutes

Background 
Soyuz 1 was the first crewed flight of the first-generation Soyuz 7K-OK spacecraft and Soyuz rocket, designed as part of the Soviet lunar program. It was the first Soviet crewed spaceflight in over two years, and the first Soviet crewed flight following the death of the Chief Designer of the space program Sergei Korolev. Komarov was launched on Soyuz 1 despite failures of the previous uncrewed tests of the 7K-OK, Kosmos 133 and Kosmos 140. A third attempted test flight was a launch failure; a launch abort triggered a malfunction of the launch escape system, causing the rocket to explode on the pad. The escape system successfully pulled the spacecraft to safety.

According to interviews with Venyamin Russayev, a former KGB agent, prior to launch, Soyuz 1 engineers are said to have reported 203 design faults to party leaders, but their concerns "were overruled by political pressures for a series of space feats to mark the anniversary of Lenin's birthday". Russayev also claims that Yuri Gagarin was the backup pilot for Soyuz 1, and was aware of the design problems and the pressures from the Politburo to proceed with the flight. He attempted to "bump" Komarov from the mission, knowing that the Soviet leadership would not risk a national hero on the flight. At the same time, Komarov refused to pass on the mission, even though he believed it to be doomed. He explained that he could not risk Gagarin's life. Russayev's account, though not disprovable, has been seen as implausible and exaggerated by most historians of the Soviet space program. 

Mission planners intended to launch a second Soyuz flight the next day carrying cosmonauts Valery Bykovsky, Yevgeny Khrunov, and Aleksei Yeliseyev, with Khrunov and Yeliseyev scheduled to do an EVA over to Soyuz 1.

Mission details 
Soyuz 1 was launched on 23 April 1967 at 00:32 GMT from Baikonur Cosmodrome carrying Komarov, the first Soviet cosmonaut to fly in space twice, in the 7K-OK No. 4 capsule. Problems began shortly after launch when one solar panel failed to unfold, leading to a shortage of power for the spacecraft's systems. Further problems with the orientation detectors complicated maneuvering the craft. By orbit 13, the automatic stabilisation system was completely dead, and the manual system was only partially effective.

The crew of Soyuz 2 modified their mission goals, preparing themselves for a launch that would include fixing the solar panel of Soyuz 1. However, that night, thunderstorms at Baikonur Cosmodrome in Kazakhstan affected the booster's electrical system, causing the mission to be called off.

As a result of Komarov's report during the 13th orbit, the flight director decided to abort the mission. After 18 orbits, Soyuz 1 fired its retrorockets and reentered the Earth's atmosphere. Despite the technical difficulties up to that point, Komarov might still have landed safely. To slow the descent, first the drogue parachute was deployed, followed by the main parachute. However, due to a defect, the main parachute did not unfold; the exact reason for the main parachute malfunction is disputed.

Komarov then activated the manually deployed reserve chute, but it became tangled with the drogue chute, which did not release as intended. A rescue helicopter spotted the descent module lying on its side with the parachute spread across the ground on fire. The retrorockets then started firing which concerned the rescuers since they were supposed to activate a few moments prior to touchdown. By the time they landed and approached, the descent module was in flames with black smoke filling the air and streams of molten metal dripping from the exterior. The entire base of the capsule burned through. By this point, it was obvious that Komarov had not survived, but there was no code signal for a cosmonaut's death, so the rescuers fired a signal flare calling for medical assistance. Another group of rescuers in an aircraft then arrived and attempted to extinguish the blazing spacecraft with portable fire extinguishers. This proved insufficient and they instead began using shovels to throw dirt onto it. The descent module then completely disintegrated, leaving only a pile of debris topped by the entry hatch. When the fire at last ended, the rescuers were able to dig through the rubble to find Komarov strapped into the center couch, his body had turned into charred clothing and flesh. Doctors pronounced the cause of death to be from multiple blunt-force injuries. The body was transported to Moscow for an official autopsy in a military hospital where the cause of death was verified to match the field doctors' conclusions.

There is a memorial monument at the site in the form of a black column with a bust of Komarov at the top, in a small park on the roadside.

Posthumously, Komarov was named a Hero of the Soviet Union for the second time, and awarded the Order of Lenin. He was given a state funeral, and his ashes were interred in the Kremlin Wall Necropolis at Red Square, Moscow.

Eight years after Komarov's death, a story began circulating that Komarov cursed the engineers and flight staff, and spoke to his wife as he descended, and these transmissions were received by an NSA listening station near Istanbul. Historians such as Asif Azam Siddiqi regard this to be untrue.

Legacy 
The Soyuz 1 tragedy delayed the launch of Soyuz 2 and Soyuz 3 until 25 October 1968. This 18-month gap, with the addition of the explosion of an uncrewed N-1 rocket on 3 July 1969, scuttled Soviet plans of landing a cosmonaut on the Moon. The original mission of Soyuz 1 and Soyuz 2 was ultimately achieved by Soyuz 4 and Soyuz 5.

A much improved Soyuz program emerged from this eighteen-month delay, mirroring the improvements made in the Apollo program after the Apollo 1 tragedy. Although it failed to reach the Moon, the Soyuz went on to be repurposed from the centerpiece of the Zond lunar program to the people-carrier of the Salyut space station program, the Mir space station, and the International Space Station. Although it suffered another tragedy with the Soyuz 11 accident in 1971, and went through several incidents with non-fatal launch aborts and landing mishaps, it has become one of the longest-lived and most dependable crewed spacecraft yet designed.

Komarov is commemorated in two memorials left on the lunar surface: one left at Tranquility Base by Apollo 11, and the Fallen Astronaut statue and plaque left by Apollo 15.

References

External links 

 An analysis of the Soyuz-1 flight from Sven Grahn
 Soyuz-1 on the Encyclopedia Astronautica

Crewed Soyuz missions
Space accidents and incidents in the Soviet Union
Space program fatalities
Spacecraft launched in 1967
1967 in the Soviet Union
Spacecraft which reentered in 1967